Cassanova McKinzy (born November 17, 1992) is an American football outside linebacker for the Vegas Vipers of the XFL. He played college football at Auburn, and was signed by the Tampa Bay Buccaneers as an undrafted free agent in 2016.

Early years
McKinzy is the son of Joann Brown and Charles Drake. He attended Woodlawn High School, where he played high school football for the Colonels.

College career
A 4-star recruit, McKinzy committed to Auburn to play under head coach Gus Malzahn, over offers from Alabama, Arkansas, Arkansas State, Clemson, Florida State, Kansas, and UAB. He played three seasons from 2012-2015.

Professional career

Tampa Bay Buccaneers
McKinzy was signed by the Tampa Bay Buccaneers as an undrafted free agent following the 2016 NFL Draft. On August 22, 2016, he was released by the team.

Los Angeles Rams
On January 3, 2017, McKinzy signed a reserve/future contract with the Los Angeles Rams. He was waived on September 2, 2017 and was signed to the Rams' practice squad the next day. He was released by the team on September 19, 2017.

Washington Redskins
On January 1, 2018, McKinzy signed a reserve/future contract with the Washington Redskins. He was released on April 30, 2018, but re-signed on August 6.

On September 1, 2018, McKinzy was waived for final roster cuts before the start of the 2018 season but signed to the team's practice squad the next day. He was promoted to the active roster on October 29, 2018, but was waived the next day and re-signed to the practice squad. He was promoted back to the active roster on November 9, 2018. He suffered a torn pectoral in Week 12 and was ruled out for the rest of the season.

On October 7, 2019, McKinzy was released by the Redskins and re-signed to the practice squad. His practice squad contract with the team expired on January 6, 2020.

Calgary Stampeders
McKinzy signed with the Calgary Stampeders of the CFL on June 16, 2021.

Vegas Vipers
McKinzy was drafted by the Vegas Vipers during the 2023 XFL Draft.

References

External links
Auburn Tigers bio
NFL Draft profile
Washington Redskins bio

1992 births
Living people
African-American players of American football
American football linebackers
Players of American football from Birmingham, Alabama
Auburn Tigers football players
Tampa Bay Buccaneers players
Los Angeles Rams players
Washington Redskins players
Calgary Stampeders players
Vegas Vipers players
21st-century African-American sportspeople